Littlejohn & Co. is a private equity firm focused on leveraged buyout transactions, leveraged recapitalizations of middle-market companies and distressed securities.  The firm focuses on companies requiring an operational turnaround particularly in a variety of industrial and service sectors.

The firm is based in Cos Cob, Connecticut and was founded in 1996 by Angus C. Littlejohn Jr.

History
In 1996, Angus Littlejohn resigned from Joseph Littlejohn & Levy (today known as JLL Partners) to form a new private investment firm with Michael Klein: Littlejohn & Co.  JLL underwent significant turnover as the following year co-founder Peter Joseph also left the firm.

Littlejohn traces its roots back to Gilliam Joseph & Littlejohn, a merchant bank founded in 1987 by Angus C. Littlejohn Jr., along with William J. Gilliam and Peter A. Joseph.  Littlejohn had previously worked with his two co-founders the Quadrex Corporation, a small New York brokerage firm.  In 1988, Paul S. Levy, formerly a managing director, at Drexel Burnham Lambert, focusing on corporate restructurings and exchange offers was recruited to join the firm, which was renamed Gilliam Joseph Littlejohn & Levy and later Joseph Littlejohn & Levy, when Gilliam was forced to leave the partnership in 1989. 

In July 2014, Littlejohn & Co held a final close for its fifth fund on its hard cap of $2 billion.

Funds raised
Since its founding, Littlejohn has raised five main private equity funds, as well as an annex fund and a distressed securities fund, with investor commitments totaling $7.8 billion:
 1997 — Littlejohn Fund I ($200 million)
 1999 — Littlejohn Fund II ($530 million)
 2005 — Littlejohn Fund III ($650 million)
 2007 — Littlejohn Fund III add-on ($200 million)
 2010 — Littlejohn Fund IV ($1.34 billion)
 2014 — Littlejohn Fund V ($2.0 billion)
 2018 — Littlejohn Fund VI ($2.84 billion)

Portfolio companies
The following is a selected list of notable companies in which Littlejohn has invested:

Durakon Industries
Foodbrands America Inc.
Polymer Corporation
 PSC Inc.
 Van Houtte
Wyle Laboratories

References

External links
Littlejohn & Co. (company website)

Private equity firms of the United States
Financial services companies established in 1987
Companies based in Greenwich, Connecticut